The Oakland Public School also known as the Holmes School in  the South Oakland neighborhood of Pittsburgh, Pennsylvania was built in 1893 and expanded in 1899. It is believed that Ulysses J.L. Peoples designed the building. The school was scheduled to be closed in 1986.

The school no longer exists; it was torn down several years ago, and where it once stood is now the Holmes Place Condominiums. It was listed on the National Register of Historic Places in 1987.

References

School buildings on the National Register of Historic Places in Pennsylvania
Romanesque Revival architecture in Pennsylvania
School buildings completed in 1893
Schools in Pittsburgh
National Register of Historic Places in Pittsburgh